In mathematics, and particularly ordinary differential equations (ODEs), a monodromy matrix is the fundamental matrix of a system of ODEs evaluated at the period of the coefficients of the system. It is used for the analysis of periodic solutions of ODEs in Floquet theory.

See also
Floquet theory
Monodromy
Riemann–Hilbert problem

References

 

Ordinary differential equations